The Crime Patrol is a 1936 American film directed by Eugene Cummings.

Plot 
Boxer Bob Neal joins the police after losing a fight against Officer Davis. Together they arrest Neal's former friends who stole a truck.

Cast 
Ray Walker as Bob Neal
Geneva Mitchell as Nurse Mary Prentiss
Herbert Corthell as Police Commissioner Joe Collins
Hooper Atchley as Dr. Simmons
Wilbur Mack as Vic Santell
Russ Clark as Officer Davis
Max Wagner as Henchman Bennie
Virginia True Boardman as Mrs. Kate Neal
Hal Taliaferro as Henchman Driving Getaway Car
'Snub' Pollard as Gyp Hoyle
Henry Roquemore as Fight Promoter
Robert McKenzie as Mr. Stevens, store owner

External links 

1936 films
1930s English-language films
American black-and-white films
1936 romantic drama films
1936 crime drama films
American crime drama films
American romantic drama films
1930s American films